Korovii Yar is a village in Kramatorsk Raion (district) in Donetsk Oblast of eastern Ukraine, at about  north by west from the centre of Donetsk city. It belongs to Lyman Urban Hromada, one of the hromadas of Ukraine.

The village came under attack by Russian forces in 2022, during the Russian invasion of Ukraine.

References

Villages in Kramatorsk Raion